Adam Číž (born August 23, 1991 in Ostrava, Czech Republic) is a Czech professional basketball player for the BK NH Ostrava and he starts at the point guard position. Adam is a longtime captain of his team, which plays in the highest competition in the Czech Republic named Kooperativa NBL. Thanks to his nickname "Olovo" (or "the Lead") and his notorious toughness, he was able to gain respect through the basketball world.

Career 
Adam is also a member of the extended team of the Czech republic national basketball team.

In the year 2015/2016, in the regular season he averaged 35,4 minutes, 14.0 points, 3.7 rebounds, 4.7 assists and effectivity 14.6 per game and he was also the most valuable player of his team.

References

External links
 Profil hráče na stránkách České basketbalové federace
http://moravskoslezsky.denik.cz/ostatni_region/kapitan-nove-huti-adam-ciz-po-derby-uznal-dosly-nam-sily-to-jsme-ale-cekali-20151230.html

1991 births
Living people
Czech men's basketball players
Point guards
Sportspeople from Ostrava